Tsing Lung Tsuen, also transliterated as Ching Loong Tsuen, is a village in the San Tin area of Yuen Long District, Hong Kong.

Administration
Ching Loong Tsuen is a recognized village under the New Territories Small House Policy.

References

External links
 Delineation of area of existing village Tsing Lung Tsuen (San Tin) for election of resident representative (2019 to 2022)

Villages in Yuen Long District, Hong Kong
San Tin